Samuelsen is a Scandinavian patronymic surname meaning "son of Samuel".  There are alternative spellings such as the English language Samuelson and the Swedish Samuelsson.  It is uncommon as a given name.  Samuelsen may refer to:

 Aage Samuelsen (1919–1987), Norwegian evangelist, singer and composer
 Alf Ivar Samuelsen (1942–2014), Norwegian politician
 Anders Samuelsen (born 1967), Danish politician
 Andras Samuelsen (1873–1954), Faroese politician and Prime Minister
 Frank Samuelsen (1870–1946), Norwegian-American who, with George Harbo, became the first to row across an ocean
 Jone Samuelsen (born 1984), Norwegian footballer
 Símun Samuelsen (born 1985), Faroese footballer

See also
 Samuels
 Samuelson
 Samuelsson

Danish-language surnames
Norwegian-language surnames
Patronymic surnames
Surnames from given names